Parco can refer to:

 Parco, Tibet, a town in China
 Parco (retailer), a chain of department stores primarily in Japan
 Parco Historic District (also known as Sinclair Historic District), Sinclair, Wyoming, United States
 Parco P.I., a reality television program
 Pak-Arab Refinery (PARCO), an energy company in Pakistan
 Jim Parco (born 1968), former United States Air Force lieutenant colonel
 John Parco (born 1971), Italian-Canadian ice hockey player and coach

See also
 Parco is also Italian for "park". For the numerous articles on parks in Italy see:
 
 
 Parc (disambiguation)
 Park (disambiguation)